Ángel Luis Miranda Andújar (born November 9, 1969 in Arecibo, Puerto Rico), is a former professional baseball pitcher. He played all or parts of five seasons in Major League Baseball, from 1993 until 1997, for the Milwaukee Brewers.

Career

Brewers 
Miranda originally signed with the Brewers before the 1987 season. He worked his way up through their farm system until making his major league debut on June 5, 1993. After splitting the 1994 season between the major and minor leagues, he spent the entire 1995–96 seasons with the Brewers. He was released by the Brewers on June 17, 1997.

Minor leagues 
After signing with the Cleveland Indians organization shortly thereafter, Miranda was released again, then signed by the Texas Rangers. He became a minor league free agent after the 1997 season, then pitched in the independent leagues for most of the next eight seasons, including a stint in the Mexican League in 2001.

Puerto Rico 
Since 2008, Miranda has played and coached in the Federación de Béisbol Aficionado de Puerto Rico. In 2008, he played for the San Sebastián Patrulleros. In 2009, Miranda joined the Añasco Fundadores, first as a pitcher, then as manager. He returned to pitching action in April 2010 when he joined the Florida Titanes as a starting pitcher. In 2011, he served as pitching coach for the Camuy Arenas.

References

External links

1969 births
Living people
Aberdeen Arsenal players
Atlantic City Surf players
Beloit Brewers players
Bridgeport Bluefish players
Buffalo Bisons (minor league) players
Butte Copper Kings players
Denver Zephyrs players
Diablos Rojos del México players
El Paso Diablos players
Guerreros de Oaxaca players
Helena Brewers players
Lehigh Valley Black Diamonds players
Major League Baseball pitchers
Major League Baseball players from Puerto Rico
Mexican League baseball pitchers
Milwaukee Brewers players
Nashua Pride players
New Orleans Zephyrs players
Northeast League Aces players
Oklahoma City 89ers players
Pennsylvania Road Warriors players
People from Arecibo, Puerto Rico
Puerto Rican expatriate baseball players in Mexico
Stockton Ports players
Criollos de Caguas players
Leones de Ponce players
Puerto Rican expatriate baseball players in Taiwan
Mercuries Tigers players